The SIPA S.251 Antilope was a low-wing monoplane, seating four or five and powered by a single turboprop engine, developed in France in the early 1960s. It set a number of class records but was not put into production.

Design and development

The Antilope was one of the first turboprop powered light aircraft.  Apart from its engine, it was a conventional all-metal low-wing machine.  The cantilever wing was built around two spars and was a semi-monocoque structure, carrying unslotted ailerons and electrically powered, single slot Fowler flaps. The fuselage was also of semi-monocoque construction.  The tail unit included a variable incidence tailplane and a rudder with a trim tab.

It had an electrically actuated tricycle undercarriage, the main wheels retracting inwards into the wings.  The cabin had seats for four or five, two at the front and a bench seat behind. In a proposed air ambulance configuration, the Antilope would have carried two stretchers and a medic.  Access to the cabin was via a large rear hinged door on the starboard side.

The Antilope was powered by a 665 hp (495 kW) Turbomeca Astazou X driving a 3-bladed propeller, on a long spinner, well ahead of the surrounding air intake.

It first flew on 7 November 1962 and gained certification in April 1964. That autumn, P. Bonneau set six international Class C1c (1000 – 1750 kg) records with it, achieving for example a speed of 432.9 km/h (267 mph) over a 3 km course and reaching an altitude of 10,420 m (34,186 ft).  Early in 1965 it flew with a four-bladed propeller and improved on one of its own records.  A three-blade propeller was re-installed and the aircraft was exhibited at the 1965 Paris Air Show wearing registration F-BJSS. By mid 1966 development had been completed without a decision to commence production.  The production version would have been known as the SIPA S.2510 Antilope but none were built; the prototype (F-WJSS) carried the designation S.251 on its fin.

The sole Antilope is undergoing restoration in a private museum, owned by the Association Antilope, at Montpelier-Mediterranee Airport, in southern France.

Specifications (S.2510)

References

Further reading
 

1960s French civil utility aircraft
S0251
Single-engined tractor aircraft
Low-wing aircraft
Single-engined turboprop aircraft
Aircraft first flown in 1962